Pachliopta mariae is a species of butterfly from the family Papilionidae (the swallowtails) that is found in the Philippines.

The wingspan is 100–110 mm. The wings are generally black with red spots and white markings.

The larvae feed on Aristolochia species.

Subspecies
Pachliopta mariae mariae (Philippines: Bohol, Cebu, Leyte, Mindanao, Panaon, Samar)
Pachliopta mariae almae (Semper, 1891) (Philippines: Luzon, Polillo)
Pachliopta mariae camarines Schröder & Treadaway, 1978 (Philippines: Luzon)

References

Page M.G.P & Treadaway, C.G. 2003 Schmetterlinge der Erde, Butterflies of the World Part XVII (17), Papilionidae IX Papilionidae of the Philippine Islands. Edited by Erich Bauer and  Thomas Frankenbach  Keltern: Goecke & Evers; Canterbury: Hillside Books. 

Pachliopta
Butterflies described in 1878
Butterflies of Asia